Claus Clausen (15 August 1899 – 25 November 1989) was a German film actor. He appeared in more than 21 films between 1930 and 1968.

Selected filmography
 Westfront 1918 (1930) as The Lieutenant
 Cyanide (1930) as Max
 Scapa Flow (1930)  
 Scandalous Eva (1930) as Schlotterbeck
 Mountains on Fire (1931) as Lieutenant Kall
 Doomed Battalion (1932) as Lieutenant Kall (archive footage)
 Hitlerjunge Quex (1934) as Brigade Leader Kass
 The Old and the Young King (1935) as Lieutenant Katte
 A German Robinson Crusoe (1940) as Fritz Grothe
 The Fire Devil (1940)
 My Life for Ireland (1941) as Patrick Pollock
 The Great King (1942) as Prince Henry the Older
 Kolberg (1942) as Frederick William III of Prussia
 The Devil Makes Three (1952) as Heisemann
 The Cornet (1956) as General Graf Spork
  (1968, TV film) as Norbert de Varenne

References

External links

1899 births
1989 deaths
German male film actors
20th-century German male actors
People from Eisenach
People from Saxe-Weimar-Eisenach